The tenth season of The Bachelorette premiered on May 19, 2014, and featured Andi Dorfman, a 27-year-old assistant district attorney from Atlanta, Georgia.  Dorfman finished in third place on season 18 of The Bachelor, featuring Juan Pablo Galavis, after she eliminated herself because of Galavis' behavior on their overnight date.

The season concluded on July 28, 2014, with Dorfman accepting a proposal from 29-year-old Josh Murray. They announced their break-up on January 8, 2015.

Production

Casting and contestants
Andi Dorfman was named as the Bachelorette during the After the Final Rose special of the season 18 on The Bachelor on March 10, 2014.

Just before the cast announcement, Eric Hill, a 31-year-old intrepid quest traveler from California, was critically injured on Easter Sunday, April 20, 2014 when he slammed into a mountain near Draper, Utah. His parachute collapsed during a paragliding accident after he concluded his filming; Hill died of injuries three days later on April 23, 2014. The show honored Hill by dedicating the upcoming season to him.

On the season premiere, host Chris Harrison dedicated the season to Hill:

Notable cast members include Josh Murray, who is the brother of football quarterback and future NFL player Aaron Murray.

Filming and development
The season began filming on Wednesday, March 12, 2014. in California. Other locales include Connecticut, France, Italy and Belgium with notable performances from This Wild Life, Boyz II Men and American Young. Filming of this season had been paused for a few days, many producers and eliminated contestants went to Hill's hometown for his grief.

Contestants
The season began with 25 contestants.

In week 1, season 8 contestant Chris Bukowski asked to join the cast, but Dorfman eliminated him at the rose ceremony.

Future appearances

The Bachelor
Chris Soules was chosen  as the bachelor for the nineteenth season of The Bachelor. Cody Sattler made a surprise cameo during Chris' introduction video.
Nick Viall was chosen as the bachelor for the twenty-first season of The Bachelor. Dorfman made an appearance during the Hometown Dates episode.

The Bachelorette
Viall returned for the eleventh season of The Bachelorette.  He entered the competition during week 4, with Kaitlyn Bristowe's permission in New York City. He finished as runner-up against Shawn Booth.

Bachelor in Paradise
Season 1

Dylan Petitt, Marquel Martin, Tasos Hernandez, Marcus Grodd and Cody Sattler returned for the first season of Bachelor in Paradise. Petitt was eliminated during week 2, and Martin during week 4. Hernandez split from his partner, Christy Hansen, during week 7. Sattler left Paradise in a relationship with his partner, Michelle Money. Grodd ended the season engaged to his partner, Lacy Faddoul.

Season 3

Viall, Brett Melnick, Carl King, and Josh Murray returned for the third season of Bachelor in Paradise. King was eliminated during week 4. Melnick quit the show during week 5. Viall split from his partner, Jennifer Saviano, during week 6. Murray ended the season engaged to his partner, Amanda Stanton.

Dancing with the Stars
Soules competed in the twentieth season of Dancing with the Stars. He partnered with Witney Carson and finished in 5th place. Viall competed in the twenty-fourth season of Dancing With the Stars. He partnered with Peta Murgatroyd and finished in 7th place.

Call-out order

 The contestant received the first impression rose
 The contestant received a rose during a date
 The contestant was eliminated outside the rose ceremony
 The contestant was eliminated
 The contestant was eliminated during a date
 The contestant quit the competition
 The contestant won the competition

Episodes

Notes

References

External links

2014 American television seasons
The Bachelorette (American TV series) seasons
Television shows filmed in California
Television shows filmed in Connecticut
Television shows filmed in France
Television shows filmed in Italy
Television shows filmed in Belgium
Television shows filmed in Wisconsin
Television shows filmed in Iowa
Television shows filmed in Florida
Television shows filmed in Texas
Television shows filmed in the Dominican Republic